Anchorage Digital is a digital asset platform and infrastructure provider that deals in the holding, investing, and infrastructure for cryptocurrency and cryptocurrency products. It has the first federally chartered cryptocurrency bank, receiving approval from the Office of the Comptroller of the Currency in 2021.

History
Anchorage Digital was founded in 2017 by Diogo Mónica and Nathan McCauley. Early investors included Andreessen Horowitz and Blockchain Capital. Visa became an investor in Anchorage Digital in 2019, and uses the company to provide cryptocurrency payment services.
 
Anchorage Digital made its first acquisition in 2020 with the purchase of Merkle Data. The same year it also added trading and financing services. Anchorage opened an engineering hub in Porto, Portugal in 2020 and is the first cryptocurrency unicorn with a presence in that country.
 
In 2021, Anchorage Digital Bank received its banking charter from the Office of the Comptroller of the Currency, making it the first federally chartered cryptocurrency bank in the United States. The same year, it was contracted by the United States Department of Justice to be the custodian for all digital assets seized or forfeited in criminal cases. It also became the first known United States bank to custody a NFT by facilitating a purchase for Visa.
 
In December 2021, Anchorage Digital was valued at more than $3 billion and had raised capital from investors such as KKR, Goldman Sachs, GIC (Singaporean sovereign wealth fund), and Wellington Management.

Services
 
Anchorage Digital is a custodian of digital assets for financial institutions such as banks, venture capital firms, and fintechs, as well as governments. It uses biometric authentication and hardware security modules for storing and securing cryptocurrency. It also provides lending and trading of digital assets, including infrastructure used by companies to build cryptocurrency products.

References

External links
Official website

Companies established in 2017
Financial services companies based in California
Banks established in 2017
Financial services companies established in 2017